Mwanga I Sebanakitta was Kabaka of the Kingdom of Buganda from 1740 until 1741. He was the twenty third (23rd) Kabaka of Buganda.

Claim to the throne
He was the eldest son of Prince Musanje Golooba. His mother was Nabulya Naluggwa of the Ndiga clan, the second wife of his father. He ascended to the throne after the death of his uncle, Kabaka Mawanda Sebanakitta, in 1740.

Married life
He is recorded to have married five (5) wives:

 Najjuma, daughter of Natiigo, of the Lugave clan
 Nakabugo, daughter of Mugema, of the Nkima clan
 Naabakyaala Nakiwala, Omubikka, daughter of Semwanga, of the Ngonge clan
 Nalubowa, daughter of Segiriinya, of the Ngo clan
 Namakula, daughter of Mpinga, of the Lugave clan

Issue
He is recorded to have fathered three (3) sons:

 Prince (Omulangira) Mulage, whose mother was Najjuma. He became Sabaddu to the princesses.
 Prince (Omulangira) Kiwanuka, whose mother was Nakabugo
 Prince (Omulangira) Nkondoggo, whose mother was Namakula

The final years

Kabaka Mwanga I Sebanakitta was killed by Nkunnumbi, in revenge for the murder of his son, around 1741. He was initially buried at Meerera. In 1860, his remains were exhumed and re-buried at Kavumba, Busiro. He was succeeded by his brother, Prince Namuggala Kagali.

Succession table

See also
 Kabaka of Buganda

References

External links
List of the Kings of Buganda

Kabakas of Buganda
18th-century monarchs in Africa